Jean-Pierre Allemand (born 4 April 1942) is a French épée fencer. He competed at the 1968 and 1972 Summer Olympics.

References

External links
 

1942 births
Living people
Sportspeople from Finistère
French male épée fencers
Olympic fencers of France
Fencers at the 1968 Summer Olympics
Fencers at the 1972 Summer Olympics
20th-century French people